Merrion is a townland and suburban area located about 4 km south east of Dublin City.

Merrion is situated along the Merrion Road between Ballsbridge to the north and Booterstown to the south. This stretch of road, about 1 km long, contains a shopping mall (the Merrion Centre), St. Vincent's University Hospital, a Catholic church (Our Lady Queen Of Peace), the Merrion Inn public house, a petrol station, a Bank of Ireland branch, a restaurant and several retail outlets.

Merrion lies within the administrative area of Dublin City Council, and ends at the border with the Dun Laoghaire-Rathdown County Council administrative area, near the Merrion Gates.

References

Towns and villages in Dublin (city)
Townlands of County Dublin